The Bandra Bus Co was a transport company operated by the Bandra Municipal Committee between the late 1920s to 1949. It was taken over by the Brihanmumbai Electric Supply and Transport in 1949.

References 

Bus companies of India
Bandra
Defunct transport companies of India